Lechenaultia longiloba, commonly named Irwin leschenaultia, is a species of flowering plant in the family Goodeniaceae and is endemic to the south-west of Western Australia. It is a straggling, low-lying herb or subshrub with narrow, rather fleshy leaves, and pale yellow or green petals with deep pink or red wings.

Description
The petal lobes are more or less the same size, the upper lobes erect and the lower lobes spreading.

Taxonomy
Lechenaultia longiloba was first formally described in 1867 by Ferdinand von Mueller in Fragmenta Phytographiae Australiae from specimens collected by James Drummond. The specific epithet (longiloba) means "long-lobed", referring to the sepals.

Distribution and habitat
Irwin leschenaultia grows in sandy soil in heath and is found from Dongara to Mullewa in the Geraldton Sandplains biogeographic region of south-western Western Australia.

Conservation status
This leschenaultia is listed as "Priority Four" by the Government of Western Australia Department of Biodiversity, Conservation and Attractions, meaning that it is rare or near threatened.

References

Asterales of Australia
longiloba
Eudicots of Western Australia
Plants described in 1867
Taxa named by Ferdinand von Mueller